The Band, הלהקה, (also known as The Troupe) is an Israeli comedic musical, first shown in April 1978, about an army singing group in 1968. Three new members are hazed at first, one of them falls in love, and the choir's leader, in preparation for a television appearance, rehearses the troupe so much they revolt. The movie was initially unsuccessful but has gained in popularity. The choir's leader is based on real-life composer, arranger, and music director of the Nahal troupe, Yair Rosenblum. The film was directed by Avi Nesher.

Plot
The film takes place in Israel 1968 during the War of Attrition. An army entertainment troupe (based on the Nahal troupe), perform comedy and singing acts to the Israeli soldiers in combat zones to boost morale. At the beginning of the film, three departing members of the troupe perform an old Broadway-style song. The next day, auditions, led by the director Paul Aviv (Tuvia Tzafir) are held for the three new members. The three chosen members are the forward Giora Datner (Gidi Gov), the nerdy Jerry Lewis-type Bazooka (Meir Suissa), and the beautifully talented Noa (Dafana Armoni). As part of the welcome wagon, the veteran members give the new recruits the silent treatment by playing practical jokes on them.

During a rehearsal, Leicht, the assistant musical director randomly gives Noa a solo that the troupe's prima donna member, Yaffa (Smadar Brenner), initially sings. As Noa amazes everyone in the rehearsal hall, Yaffa storms out of the room. When Datner and Bazooka learn about the new recruit welcome wagon tradition, they decide to get revenge by playing practical jokes back on the veteran troupe members. On their first performance, Yaffa and the troupe's shorty male diva Doron receive electric shocks when touching wet microphones, Shuka, the drummer gets his drums destroyed, Moni, the keyboard player gets powder puffing out of his keyboard, and the audience find it to be hilarious, thinking it was part of the act.
 
The next day, Doron with Moni and Shuka spread dog poop all over Datner's bus seat. When Datner sees the messy seat, he faints. After the seat is cleaned, he suddenly winks at Moni's girlfriend and featured soloist Micki (Liron Nirgad), who begins to have a secret liking for him. The bus brings the troupe from show to show, making stops at cafes in between.

Along the journey, the troupe's male lead singer Dani (Sassi Kesshet) and Yaffa's boyfriend, the commander Moti (Doval'e Glickman) both have a love for Noa, which initially causes them to feud. The timid Bazooka gets a crush on Dani's girlfriend, Orli (Chelli Goldenberg), while Datner gives Bazooka lessons on how to develop relationships.

The morning following another show, Datner and Bazooka perform another prank on the veteran members by putting themselves in harnesses in a bathroom pretending they committed suicide. As the veteran members' see the 2 members hung, they are met with horror. However at a certain cue, Datner and Bazooka begin to start yelling freaking everyone in the bathroom out.

Following a performance at an Israeli Independence day party, Datner continues to help shy Bazooka with his relationship lessons by hooking him up with two girls, who later are seen as drunk and begin raping Bazooka. He escapes by jumping of a window knocking over a table of food. Meanwhile, Datner and Micki begin to start a secret romance for each other. It is revealed when Datner dumps two cakes on the faces of Doron and Moni and run off with her. Moni calls off the relationship with Micki.

The next day on the way to a performance, Moti makes an announcement that the troupe will be performing on national television. His announcement causes the troupe to burst into excitement. Later that evening before the performance, Noa is given another solo causing Yaffa to become even more angry at Moti calling off their relationship. Later during the performance, a part of the scenery begins to fall nearly hitting Noa.

Hearing about the fiasco that have been happening with the troupe, Alron, the commanding officer puts them under a strict 48-hour boot camp rehearsal to prepare for the television performance. He warns them that any funny business will cause a major reduction in the troupe.

At the rehearsal, Aviv pushes the troupe really hard by having them try to learn a new song in just 24 hours and having them repeatedly start from the top when a member is off on his or her singing. Later on, Micki becomes extremely tired during a dance rehearsal. Aviv warns her to follow his every command tired or not. Micki refuses to listen and tries to leave but Aviv abruptly grabs her. Just then, Micki pulls a cup of yogurt from Aviv's table and dumps it all over his face, screams at him, and storms out of the rehearsal hall. Because of her behavior, Aviv and Moti put Micki on trial sentencing her to 30 days on probation and a transfer to another army base. Upset by the departure of one of the best members and his girlfriend, an angry Datner rebels out and leads the entire troupe in a strike against Aviv until Micki is brought back. Aviv refuses and heads out to Alron's office to tell him about the fiasco.

Outraged, Alron punishes the entire troupe by announcing that the television appearance is cancelled, and the members will be sent to new army bases. The Troupe is over. Meanwhile, at a lineup to their new bases, Zami, the troupe's electrician stops the moving by dumping two cups of yogurt on himself exclaiming to Aviv, "It's only Yogurt!" Everyone laughs including Aviv and Alron who both come to their senses. Since the television appearance has not yet been cancelled, Aviv commands everyone including Micki to get to rehearsal. Everyone cheers and is happy again. At the end of the film, The Troupe is seen performing live on television singing a song of peace and inviting the audience to join them on stage.

Cast of characters 
Gidi Gov as Giora Datner
 as Michal (Micki) Ben Tov
 as Moshe Albez
Sassi Keshet as Dani Stav
Dov Glickman as Mordechai (Moti) Helperon
 as Yafa "Yafchuk" Harish
Dafna Armoni as Noa Baron
Gali Atari as Malka Levy
Chelli Goldenberg as Orly Ne'eman
 as Sarah "Sari" Liechtenstein 
Tuvia Tzafir as Paul Aviv 
Yoni Chen as Doron
Eli Gorenstein as Zamar "Zami" Klein, aka Antenna

References

External links
"The Band" - The full film is available on VOD on the website for the Israel Film Archive - Jerusalem Cinematheque

1978 films
1970s Hebrew-language films
Israeli musical comedy films
Films set in 1968
Films about the Israel Defense Forces
1970s musical comedy films
Israeli military bands
1978 comedy films